The 19th Oregon Legislative Assembly was scheduled to convene January 11, 1897. The Senate organized, but the House failed to do so. In the House, two factions formed, neither of which had enough members to constitute a quorum.

The Senate elected Joseph Simon as its president for the term, and conducted what business it could without the House's support. It stayed in session for 40 days. Due to the House's failure to organize, no legislation was passed during the session, and Oregon failed to elect a United States Senator. Henry L. Benson and E. J. Davis were the Speakers chosen by the two rival factions; neither served as Speaker during any other session.

The legislature held a special session in 1898, from September 26 to October 15. During that session, Simon was chosen as U.S. Senator, filling a seat that had been vacant for nearly two years. E. V. Carter served as House speaker during the special session.

William Paine Lord was governor during the 19th Legislative Assembly, serving the final two years of his single 4-year term.

Members of the House

Members of the Senate

See also 
 John H. Mitchell, a U.S. Senator whose campaign for reelection was involved in the House's failure to organize.

References

External links 
 

Oregon legislative sessions
1897 in Oregon
1898 in Oregon
1897 U.S. legislative sessions
1898 U.S. legislative sessions